"Tinted Eyes" is a song by Canadian electronic music duo Dvbbs featuring American musician Blackbear and American rapper 24kGoldn. It was released on June 5, 2020.

Background
The single marks the second collaboration between Dvbbs and Blackbear after "Idwk", with all proceeds of the single being donated to Black Lives Matter.

Composition
"Tinted Eyes" is described as being "a thumping bass-driven house influenced song".

Music video
Dvbbs released the video on June 5, 2020 via Ultra Music, featuring all the artists involved in the song.

Charts

Weekly charts

Year-end charts

Certifications

References

2020 singles
2020 songs
Blackbear (musician) songs
24kGoldn songs
Songs written by Blackbear (musician)
Songs written by 24kGoldn
Songs written by Andrew Bullimore